Chris-Carol Bremer (born 5 January 1971 in Hannover) is a former German Olympic swimmer of the 1990s who captained the German swimming team at the 2000 Summer Olympics. He also competed at the 1992 Summer Olympics and the 1996 Summer Olympics.

References

1971 births
Living people
German male butterfly swimmers
Olympic swimmers of Germany
Swimmers at the 1992 Summer Olympics
Swimmers at the 1996 Summer Olympics
Sportspeople from Hanover
German male freestyle swimmers
German male swimmers
World Aquatics Championships medalists in swimming
Medalists at the FINA World Swimming Championships (25 m)
European Aquatics Championships medalists in swimming
20th-century German people
21st-century German people